Ida Maria Hämäläinen (née Sepponen; 6 May 1875, Pieksämäki - 27 July 1961) was a Finnish seamstress and politician. She was a member of the Parliament of Finland from 1927 to 1929, representing the Socialist Electoral Organisation of Workers and Smallholders. She was imprisoned from 1930 to 1932 because of her active role in the then illegal Communist Party of Finland (SKP).

References

1875 births
1961 deaths
People from Pieksämäki
People from Mikkeli Province (Grand Duchy of Finland)
Socialist Electoral Organisation of Workers and Smallholders politicians
Communist Party of Finland politicians
Members of the Parliament of Finland (1927–29)
Prisoners and detainees of Finland